Tri-Valley University (TVU) was an unaccredited university located in Pleasanton, California, United States. According to its website, the school "is a Christian higher education institution offering quality academic programs in Engineering, Business, Ministry, Law and Medicine at a Christian learning environment". Most of the classes for the school were offered online. The school was shut down after being raided by Immigration and Customs Enforcement due to possible visa fraud.

Legal problems
It is under investigation by the United States Immigration and Customs Enforcement (ICE) department for allegedly operating as a front for illegal immigration. The ICE claims the school issued F-1 visas to students who lived outside California. From May 2009 to May 2010, the school went from having 11 students with F1 visas to 939 students with F1 visas. The number went to 1555 in December 2010. 89 percent of the students were from India. Students paid up to $2,700 per semester for tuition. Furthermore, the Department of Homeland Security claims students who were enrolled were paid if they referred another student to the school. Susan Su, operator of the school specifically blamed two student workers, one of whom runs a consulting company, for operating the visa fraud scheme. The school was shut down after a raid by ICE on January 19, 2011. The US Attorney filed suit to forfeit five properties owned by Susan Su relating to the school.

Foreign students, mostly from India, were interrogated by the ICE. Some were radio-tagged to monitor their movements, a move the Indian government protested as treating the students who had been tricked by TVU's promoters like common criminals.
ICE has set up a web page for former TVU students, instructing them to call SEVP to discuss the students' options.

In March 2011, The Chronicle of Higher Education published an investigation into the practices of TVU and other American for-profit higher education institutions that are virtually unknown within the United States, lack accreditation, and specialize in enrolling foreign students.

On May 2, 2011, TVU's founder and owner, Susan Su, was arrested on indictments by a Federal Grand Jury on 33 counts. 
 
On October 12, 2011, four students, Vishal Dasa, Tushar Tambe, Ramakrishna Reddy Karra, and Anji Reddy Dirisinala who worked in campus jobs offered by the TVU president were charged in relation to the same case.

On July 11, 2014, Vishal Dasa was sentenced to 30 days' probation, Anji Reddy Dirisinala to one day's probation, Karra to six months' probation and a $2,000 fine, and Tushar Tambe to three years' probation with 200 hours of community service. On October 31, 2014, Ms. Su was sentenced to 16 years in prison, forfeiture of $5.6 million, and over $900,000 restitution.

While the case against Ms. Su was pending, she was listed as president of a new unaccredited university called Global TV University, based in the same office complex where TVU was located. The State Attorney-General denied the application for a new university at that site, citing, among other issues, the use of a proxy in the application.

On March 24, 2014, Ms. Su was found guilty on 31 counts in the federal case against her. Prosecutors said Su netted $5.9 million through mail fraud, visa fraud and money laundering and used the money to buy luxury cars and real estate. Ms. Su's appeal to the United States Court of Appeals for the 9th Circuit was denied on December 7, 2015, and on March 24, 2016, her lawyer filed an appeal to the US Supreme Court, which he later withdrew. On April 1, 2016, Ms. Su filed an appeal to the US Supreme Court pro se, which was denied on May 16, 2016.

Accreditation
The university started operating in 2008. They were able to operate under a religious exemption from California Bureau for Private Postsecondary and Vocational Education. However, that ended in 2010 when California Bureau for Private Postsecondary Education handled these issues. The university did file for a religious exemption, but the request was denied. As a result, the school could no longer accept new students starting in January 2010. The school was certified by Department of Homeland Security to offer F1 Visas. One rule to qualify for issuing student visas to foreigners is that the school's credits be accepted by three different established universities. However, a review of the affidavits' files found two of the schools did not accept credits offered by the University, which started the investigation. Several students were interrogated throughout the investigation.

See also

Diploma mill
Herguan University – Raided by ICE on August 3, 2012 for similar reasons. Susan Su taught here before starting Tri-Valley.
List of unaccredited institutions of higher education
List of unrecognized higher education accreditation organizations
University of Northern Virginia – Raided by ICE on July 28, 2011 for similar reasons

References

Unaccredited institutions of higher learning in California
Unaccredited Christian universities and colleges in the United States
Education in Pleasanton, California
Educational institutions established in 2008
Educational institutions disestablished in 2011
2008 establishments in California
2011 disestablishments in California
History of immigration to the United States